Matthew Pennington (born 6 October 1994) is an English professional footballer who currently plays as a centre back for Shrewsbury Town.

He has also represented the England national under-19 football team at international level.

Club career

Everton
Pennington joined Everton at the age of 11. In July 2013, he signed a new contract which would keep him at the club until the summer of 2015, followed by a three-year deal taking him to 2018.
He played in two friendlies during July 2015 against Dundee and Leeds United and then made his full debut against Barnsley in the League Cup on 26 August 2015.

Tranmere Rovers (loan)
On 2 January 2014, Pennington joined League One side Tranmere Rovers on a one month's loan deal. He made his debut on 4 January 2014, playing ninety minutes in a 1–1 draw with Wolverhampton Wanderers. On 25 January 2014, he scored his first senior goal in a 1–0 win over Crewe Alexandra. He was recalled by Everton on 22 February 2014 to strengthen their under-21 squad.
On 27 March 2014, he re-joined Tranmere on loan until the end of the season.

Coventry City (loan)
On 27 November 2014, Pennington joined Coventry City on loan until 4 January, and this was subsequently extended to 7 February. In January 2015, he was voted as the club's Player of the Month in a poll conducted by the Coventry Telegraph. On 7 February 2015, his loan was extended to the end of the season, with Pennington from then on being played more consistently at his more natural centre back position. Pennington was named as Coventry City Young Player of the Year 2014–15, voted for unanimously by Coventry City manager Tony Mowbray and his coaching staff.

Walsall (loan)
On 23 March 2016, Pennington joined Walsall on loan until the end of the season, where he played 5 games at the club, before Everton activated a recall clause just 28 days into his loan spell.

Return to Everton
On 21 April 2016, his loan was terminated at the minimum 28-day point due to a defensive crisis at his home club. He was recalled to be available for Everton's FA Cup semi-final against Manchester United. After picking up a hamstring injury in the final day of the Premier League 2015/16 season on 15 May 2016 in a 3–0 victory against Norwich City,
a recurrence of the injury in pre-season required surgery and ruled Pennington out until January 2017.

After returning from injury, his first goal came on 1 April 2017, in the Merseyside derby against Liverpool, equalising the game at 1–1, in an eventual 3–1 loss.

Leeds United (loan)
On 19 July 2017, Pennington joined Leeds United on a season-long loan, for a reported loan fee of £500,000. On 6 August 2017, Pennington made his Leeds United debut in the 3–2 victory against Bolton Wanderers, he picked up an ankle injury in the match and had to be replaced by fellow debutant Conor Shaughnessy in the 2nd half. He was unavailable until the latter half of September, when he returned to the bench. In October, following inconsistent results for the team, Pennington returned intermittently to the starting eleven.

After 24 appearances, on 18 May 2018, Leeds announced Pennington would be returning to his parent club upon the expiry of his loan.

Return to Everton
He returned to Everton to play in the 2018–19 pre season under their new Manager Marco Silva and on 11 May 2018 Pennington signed a new long term contract at the club keeping him there until the end of the 2021 season.

Ipswich Town (loan)
On 31 August 2018, Pennington joined Ipswich Town on loan until the end of the season. He scored his first goal for the club in a 2–2 draw against Birmingham City on 29 September 2018, however he was later sent off in the same match.

Hull City (loan)
On 8 August 2019, Pennington joined Hull City on loan for the 2019–20 season. Pennington made his first appearance for Hull City in the first round of the EFL Cup in the 0–3 away win against Tranmere Rovers.

Shrewsbury Town (loan)
On 31 December 2020, Pennington joined League One side Shrewsbury Town on loan until the end of the 2020–21 season. On 24 April, Matthew scored his first goal for Shrewsbury in the 53rd minute during a 1-0 win away against Blackpool at Bloomfield Road.

Shrewsbury Town
On 27 May 2021, Pennington signed for Shrewsbury Town on a permanent deal following his release from Everton.

International career
Pennington made his debut for England U19s on 21 March 2013, coming on as a 70th-minute substitute in a 1–0 win over Turkey.

Career statistics

References

External links
Profile at the Everton F.C. website

1994 births
Living people
Footballers from Warrington
English footballers
England youth international footballers
Association football defenders
Everton F.C. players
Tranmere Rovers F.C. players
Coventry City F.C. players
Walsall F.C. players
Leeds United F.C. players
Ipswich Town F.C. players
Hull City A.F.C. players
English Football League players
Premier League players